Yelyakhino is a rural locality (a village) in Myaksinskoye Rural Settlement, Cherepovetsky District, Vologda Oblast, Russia. The population was 7 as of 2002.

Geography 
Yelyakhino is located 30 km southeast of Cherepovets (the district's administrative centre) by road. Kostyayevo is the nearest rural locality.

References 

Rural localities in Cherepovetsky District